Jan Johannes Labuschagne (born 16 April 1976) is a South African former rugby union player. He played as a lock. He was capped 11 times for the Springboks.

While playing for South Africa against England, Labuschagne was shown a red card in the 23rd minute for a late tackle on Jonny Wilkinson. South Africa went on to lose 53–3, a record defeat. For his actions, Labuschagne was suspended for 23 days and never represented South Africa again.

External links
itsrugby profile

References

1976 births
Living people
South African rugby union players
South Africa international rugby union players
Rugby union locks
People from Bloemhof
Rugby union players from North West (South African province)
Lions (United Rugby Championship) players
Golden Lions players